Aloxiprin (or aluminium acetylsalicylate) is a medical drug used for the treatment of pain and inflammation associated with muscular skeletal and joint disorders.
It is used for its properties as an anti-inflammatory, antipyretic and analgesic drug.
It is a chemical compound of aluminium hydroxide and aspirin.

Alternative names and combinations
 Palaprin Forte.
 Askit Powders - A powder combination of aspirin, aloxiprin and caffeine.

Contraindications
 People with allergies to salicylates.
 People with gastrointestinal ulcers.
 People with liver or kidney damage.
 Pregnant women in the 3rd trimester.
 Women who are breastfeeding.
 Use with other salicylates.
 Use with NSAIDs.

References

External links
 CTD's Aloxiprin page from the Comparative Toxicogenomics Database

Antiplatelet drugs
Acetylsalicylic acids
Aluminium compounds